Erave Rural LLG is a local-level government (LLG) of Southern Highlands Province, Papua New Guinea. The Erave language is spoken in the LLG.

Wards
01. Galu
02. Tiripi
03. Batri 1
04. Batri 2
05. Iamorubi
06. Erave Station
07. Koyari
08. Tsimberigi (Tiabili)
09. Kerabi
10. Barowai
11. Tiri
12. Waragu
13. Waposali
14. Kele
15. Puputau
16. Sirigi
17. Sopisa
18. Menekiri
19. Marorogo
20. Waro
21. Yanguli 1
22. Yanguli 2
23. Pawabi 1
24. Pawabi 2
25. Sau
26. Kati
27. Pawale
28. Niae

References

Local-level governments of Southern Highlands Province